Get on Up is a 2014 American biographical musical drama film about the life of singer James Brown and is directed by Tate Taylor and written by Jez and John-Henry Butterworth. Produced by Brian Grazer, Mick Jagger, Taylor and Victoria Pearman, the film stars an ensemble cast featuring Chadwick Boseman as Brown, Nelsan Ellis as Bobby Byrd, Dan Aykroyd as Ben Bart, Viola Davis as Susie Brown, Craig Robinson as Maceo Parker, and Octavia Spencer as Aunt Honey.

The project was announced August 2013, along with Boseman, Davis, Spencer and Ellis' casting. Principal photography began on November 4, 2013 and took place in Mississippi, where the entire film was shot on location in 49 days.

The film was released on August 1, 2014 in the United States and received generally positive reviews from critics, with praise directed at the performances of the cast (particularly those of Boseman and Ellis), and grossed $33 million worldwide at the box office.

Plot
The film uses a nonlinear narrative, following James Brown's stream of consciousness as he recalls events from his life in an asynchronous manner, occasionally breaking the fourth wall to address the audience.

In 1939, young James lives in poverty with his mother and abusive father in the backwoods of Augusta, Georgia. His mother eventually leaves and becomes a prostitute. His father joins the Army, leaving James in the care of his brothel-running aunt. He is fascinated by the shout music at a black church. Later, he fights in a "battle royal" boxing match for the amusement of a white audience. Imagining the jazz band breaking into a funk style inspires him to win the bout. He spots his mother on the street one night, but she denies knowing him.

In 1949, 17 year-old James is imprisoned for stealing a suit. When Bobby Byrd and his gospel group perform at the prison, James is inspired. He impresses Bobby with his singing, and Bobby's family supervises his parole. James establishes himself as a lead singer and shifts the group's sound toward R&B. He leads them to jump onstage at a Little Richard show, introduces them as "the Famous Flames", and they perform a rousing rendition of "Caldonia". Richard gives James advice and warns him of the "white devil". James marries Velma Warren, and they have a son, Teddy. In 1955, Ralph Bass signs the band to King Records and records their first single, "Please, Please, Please". Ben Bart becomes James' manager; he and label executive Syd Nathan relegate the rest of the band to salaried employee status, and they quit.

By 1962 James and Bobby have re-formed the band, and James finances the recording of the hugely successful Live at the Apollo. After the show he is approached by his mother, who apologizes for leaving him. He wants nothing to do with her, but gives her financial support. In 1964 James upstages the up-and-coming Rolling Stones on the T.A.M.I. Show with his high-energy performance and dance moves. By paying young radio DJs to promote his shows, he is able to avoid promoter fees. He divorces Velma and marries Deidre Jenkins, but becomes abusive toward her. He treats his new backing band like lackeys, fining them for various infractions, calling rehearsals on their days off, and berating them for questioning him. He develops a signature groove, laying the foundation for funk.

When the King-assassination riots break out in 1968, James convinces the mayor of Boston not to cancel his show at the Boston Garden. Tensions are high between the police and the black audience, but James calms the crowd and issues a plea for togetherness. He records "Say It Loud – I'm Black and I'm Proud" and pitches President Lyndon B. Johnson his idea to perform a series of USO shows for American troops in Vietnam. Though their plane is nearly shot down, the band survives and their performance is well-received.

James suffers several setbacks, beginning with Ben's death from a heart attack. He starts several businesses and is investigated by the IRS for back taxes. His band presents a list of demands; when James rebuffs them, all quit except Bobby, who helps him assemble a new band. After a 1971 concert in Paris, Bobby proposes doing a second solo album. James considers this a betrayal; they argue and Bobby quits. James' eldest son, Teddy, dies in a car accident.

In Augusta in 1988, James gets high on marijuana and PCP and visits one of his businesses, finding that someone from a neighboring seminar has used his private restroom. He confronts the seminar carrying a shotgun, which he accidentally fires into the ceiling before forgiving the offender. The police arrive and James flees in his truck, crashing through a roadblock before being apprehended and imprisoned.

In 1993, James meets Bobby for the first time in 20 years and gives him tickets to his concert at Atlanta's Omni Coliseum. As he takes the stage, he reflects on the cost he has paid for success. Seeing Bobby and his wife in the audience, he performs "Try Me", moving them to tears.

Cast

 Chadwick Boseman as James Brown
 Jamarion and Jordan Scott as young James Brown
 Nelsan Ellis as Bobby Byrd
 Dan Aykroyd as Ben Bart
 Viola Davis as Susie Brown
 Lennie James as Joseph "Joe" Brown
 Fred Melamed as Syd Nathan
 Jamal Batiste as John "Jabo" Starks
 Craig Robinson as Maceo Parker
 Jill Scott as Deidre "Dee-Dee" Jenkins
 Octavia Spencer as Aunt Honey Washington
 Atkins Estimond as Big Junior
 Josh Hopkins as Ralph Bass
 Brandon Mychal Smith as Little Richard
 Tika Sumpter as Yvonne Fair
 Aunjanue Ellis as Vicki Anderson 
 Tariq Trotter as Pee Wee Ellis
 Aloe Blacc as Nafloyd Scott
 Keith Robinson as Baby Roy
 Nick Eversman as Mick Jagger
 J. D. Evermore as Seminar Presenter
 Ahna O'Reilly as Reporter
 James DuMont as Corporal Dooley
 Stacey Scowley as Penelope White
 Liz Mikel as Gertrude Sanders
 Aaron Jay Rome as Frankie Avalon
 Clyde Jones as Daddy Grace
 Joe T. Blankenship as Alan Leeds
 Michael Papajohn as 1949 Cop
 Kirk Bovill as Announcer
 Aakomon Jones as Bobby Bennett
 John Benjamin Hickey as Richard
 Allison Janney as Kathy
 Jamell Richardson as Jimmy Nolen
 Justin Hall as Bootsy Collins
 David Carzell as Catfish Collins
 Jason Davis as Mayor Kevin White
 Billy Slaughter as Pool Cleaner
 Charles R. Rooney as President Lyndon B. Johnson
 Phyllis Montana-Leblanc as Mrs. Byrd

Production

Development 
Imagine Entertainment listed a James Brown biopic in development in 2000, with a script titled Star Time written by Steven Baigelman. Mick Jagger joined on as a producer, and Jez and John-Henry Butterworth were brought on to rewrite the script, titled Superbad. Spike Lee was set to direct but development stalled in 2006 over music licensing and finance issues. It was revived in 2012 when Jagger read a recent draft by the Butterworth brothers. John-Henry Butterworth was fascinated by the period concept of celebrity in preparing to write. “When James was becoming famous, you had to hide where you came from and be squeaky clean. Whereas if he were an artist launching his career now his upbringing and what happened to him would be right there in the press release. Everyone knows how many times 50 Cent has been shot.” The script took some liberties and includes at least one scene involving fabricated incidents. Lee vacated the directors position, and on October 22, 2012, it was announced that Tate Taylor was set to direct the untitled biopic about James Brown, to be produced by Mick Jagger and Imagine Entertainment's Brian Grazer. On August 29, 2013, Universal Pictures set October 17, 2014, as a release date for the film, previously untitled. Later, on November 13, Universal shifted the release date of the biopic from October to August 1, 2014.

Casting
On August 26, 2013, Universal selected Chadwick Boseman to play the lead role of James Brown. Boseman did all of his own dancing and some singing. The soundtrack is live recordings of James Brown. On September 17, Universal announced an open casting call for actors, musicians, and extras for different roles in the biopic, which was held on September 21. On September 30, Taylor cast Viola Davis to play Susie Brown and Octavia Spencer to play Aunt Honey. On October 21, Nelsan Ellis joined the cast of film to portray Bobby Byrd, Brown's long-time friend. Lennie James joined the cast on October 23, to play the role of Brown's father Joseph "Joe" James. Jill Scott and Dan Aykroyd were added on October 31; Scott played Brown's wife while Aykroyd played Ben Bart, the president of one of New York City's largest talent agencies Universal Attractions Agency.

On November 3, Universal added Keith Robinson to the film to portray the role of Baby Roy, a member of Brown's band. On November 14, Tika Sumpter also joined the cast, to play singer Yvonne Fair. There was a rumor that Taraji P. Henson was to join the film to play Tammi Terrell. Nick Eversman joined the cast on November 19, to play Mick Jagger.  On December 9, 2013, it became public that Brandon Mychal Smith was selected to portray Brown's musical idol, Little Richard.  On December 20, Josh Hopkins joined the film to portray the role Ralph Bass, a music producer. After the shooting wrapped up in Natchez, Mississippi, the production was looking for extras to begin a shoot on January 6, 2014, filming a concert scene set in Paris in 1971. There was another call on January 6, 2014 for extras to film some daytime scenes in Jackson on January 7, 2014.

Filming
Shooting began on November 4, 2013, in Natchez, in and around Natchez through the end of the year, and then in Jackson, Mississippi. On December 20, 2013, the film wrapped up shooting in Natchez. Crews were set to take a holiday break and then return to filming from January 6–24, 2014, in Jackson. Filming got on track again on January 6, 2014, in Jackson. On January 13, 2014, press posted the news that crews had filmed large scenes at Thalia Mara Hall, and they shot other scenes at Mississippi Coliseum, Capitol Street, and some of the restaurants in Jackson. In total Get on Up was shot in 49 days.

Soundtrack 

The soundtrack to the film, featured live performances of songs performed by James Brown, and newly produced and arranged renditions of Brown songs produced by the Underdogs. The album was released by Universal Music Enterprises on July 29, 2014.

Release
On September 1, 2014, it was announced that the film would be the opening film of the 2014 Zurich Film Festival.

Marketing
On March 13, 2014, Universal released some photos and a first official trailer of the film. A second official trailer was released on May 20.

Reception

Critical response
On Rotten Tomatoes the film holds an approval rating of 80% based on 167 reviews, with an average rating of 6.88/10. The site's consensus reads: "With an unforgettable Chadwick Boseman in the starring role, Get on Up offers the Godfather of Soul a fittingly dynamic homage." On Metacritic, the film has a weighted average score of 71 out of 100, based on 44 critics, indicating "generally favorable reviews". Audiences polled by CinemaScore gave the film an average grade of "A" on an A+ to F scale.

Brandon Smith received praise from critics for his brief but memorable role as Little Richard. Music critic Robert Christgau found the film "not just good--great. Better than The Help, which I quite admire, and Ray, which I love. A mite short of a work of genius--it fudges too much and mythologizes beyond the call of narrative necessity. But worthy of the genius who inspired it nevertheless ... Get On Up does justice to his unknowable soul and his unending music, both of which defy closure by definition."

Less favorable reviews include "Get On Up is a cagey, shapeless James Brown biopic" by Ignatiy Vishnevetsky, who rated the film D+ at The A.V. Club, Several other critics noted key facts and incidents omitted in the film, in articles such as "The Social Activist Side of James Brown You Won't See In Get On Up", "The Great Man Theory of Funk: Get On Up shows us James Brown the unstoppable personality, but skimps on James Brown the musician", and "12 Crazy James Brown Moments You Won't See in Get on Up".

Box office
The film grossed $13.4 million during its opening weekend, finishing in third place at the domestic box office behind fellow new release Guardians of the Galaxy ($94.3 million) and Lucy ($18.3 million).

Get on Up went on to gross $30.7 million in the U.S. and $2.7 million in other territories, for a worldwide total of $33.4 million by September 2014, against a $30 million budget.

References

External links
 
 

2014 films
2014 biographical drama films
2010s buddy films
2010s musical drama films
American buddy films
American biographical films
American musical drama films
2010s English-language films
African-American musical films
Biographical films about musicians
Buddy drama films
Films based on songs
Films set in Paris
Films set in 1939
Films set in 1949
Films set in 1950
Films set in 1954
Films set in 1955
Films set in 1962
Films set in 1964
Films set in 1965
Films set in 1967
Films set in 1968
Films set in 1969
Films set in 1971
Films set in 1988
Films set in 1993
Films shot in Mississippi
Films scored by Thomas Newman
Films produced by Brian Grazer
Films directed by Tate Taylor
Universal Pictures films
Imagine Entertainment films
Cultural depictions of James Brown
Films produced by Mick Jagger
African-American biographical dramas
Films with screenplays by Jez Butterworth
2014 drama films
2010s American films